Anita Louise Doherty ( deGregory; 25 January 1949 – 28 March 2022), was a Bahamian athlete, educator, and philanthropist, best known as a competitor in the pentathlon at the 1970 British Commonwealth Games as well as competing in tennis, field Hockey, netball, and softball.

She was born in Nassau, Bahamas, and grew up in West End, Grand Bahama, where she attended primary school. She attended the Hampton School (class of 1967) before matriculating into the Ulster College of Physical Education in Northern Ireland, Ulster, where she graduated.

Honours
 Doherty was inducted into the Grand Bahama Sports Hall of Fame in 2005 and The Bahamas Hall of Fame in 2011.
Anita Doherty Odd Distance Track and Field Meet and Anita Doherty Park are named in her honor on Grand Bahama Island.

Career
Doherty was the former Vice Principal and Principal of Bishop Michael Eldon School after teaching there for 31 years in total.

Death
In March 2022 Doherty was taken to the hospital after being found unresponsive, where she was later declared dead.

References

External links
 Female in sports interview ZNS

1949 births
2022 deaths
Bahamian female sprinters
Athletes (track and field) at the 1970 British Commonwealth Games
Commonwealth Games competitors for the Bahamas
People from Nassau, Bahamas
People from Freeport, Bahamas
People from West Grand Bahama
 Sportspeople
 Sportspeople
Bahamas
21st-century Bahamian politicians
21st-century Bahamian women politicians
Bahamian female tennis players
Alumni of Ulster University